The Billabong Rio Pro 2014 was an event of the Association of Surfing Professionals for 2014 ASP World Tour.

This event was held from 07 May to 18 May and contested by 36 surfers.

The tournament was won by Michel Bourez (PYF), who beat Kolohe Andino (US) in final.

Round 1

Round 2

Round 3

Round 4

Round 5

Quarter-finals

Semi-finals

Final

References
 Site ASP

Rio Pro
2014 in surfing
Sports competitions in Rio de Janeiro (city)
2014 in Brazilian sport
International sports competitions hosted by Brazil
Surfing in Brazil